Duel at Sundown is a 1965 West German and Italian western film directed by Leopold Lahola.

Story
During a cattle drive, Don McGow leaves the herd in charge of his younger brother and rides off. When the herd is reported stolen he blames himself and goes in search of the thieves only to discover it is his brother.

Cast
 Peter van Eyck as Don McGow
 Carole Gray as Nancy Parker/Greenwood
 Wolfgang Kieling as Punch Parker/Greenwood
 Terence Hill as Mario Girotti as Larry McGow
 Carl Lange as Pastor
 Walter Barnes as Pa McGow
 Jan Hendriks as Lord
 Todd Martin as Smokey Jim
 Giacomo Rossi-Stuart as Quents
 Klaus Dahlen as Baby Face
 Demeter Bitenc as Mack
 Kurt Heintel as Sheriff
 Slobodan Dimitrijevic as Ft. Clark rancher

External links
 

1965 films
1965 Western (genre) films
German Western (genre) films
1960s German-language films
Gloria Film films
Italian Western (genre) films
1960s Italian-language films
Spaghetti Western films
West German films
1960s Italian films
1960s German films